The Twelfth Amendment of the Constitution of India, officially known as The Constitution (Twelfth Amendment) Act, 1962, incorporated Goa, Daman and Diu as the eighth Union territory of India, by amending the First Schedule to the Constitution. India acquired control of Goa, Daman and Diu from Portugal in December 1961. The amendment also amended clause (1) of article 240 of the Constitution to include therein these territories in order to enable the President to "make regulations for the peace, progress and good government of the territory".

The 12th Amendment retroactively came into effect on 20 December 1961, the day following the formal ceremony of official Portuguese surrender, when Governor General Manuel António Vassalo e Silva signed the instrument of surrender bringing to an end 451 years of Portuguese rule in Goa. On 30 May 1987, the union territory was split, and Goa was made India's twenty-fifth state, with Daman and Diu remaining a union territory.

Text

Proposal and enactment

The Constitution (Twelfth Amendment) Bill, 1962 (Bill No. 3 of 1962) was introduced in the Lok Sabha on 12 March 1962. It was introduced by then Prime Minister Jawaharlal Nehru, and sought to amend article 240 and the First Schedule to the Constitution. The full text of the Statement of Objects and Reasons appended to the bill is given below: The full text of the Statement of Objects and Reasons appended to the bill is given below:

The bill was debated and passed in the original form by the Lok Sabha on 14 March 1962. It was considered and passed by the Rajya Sabha on 20 March 1962. The bill received assent from then President Rajendra Prasad on 27 March 1962, and was notified in The Gazette of India on 28 March 1962. It retroactively came into force from 20 December 1961.

See also
10th Amendment
List of amendments of the Constitution of India

References

12
1962 in India
1962 in law
Nehru administration
Daman and Diu
Government of Goa